is a junction passenger railway station located in the northern part of Takatsu-ku, Kawasaki, Kanagawa Prefecture, Japan, operated by the private railway operator Tokyu Corporation.

Lines
Futako-Shinchi Station is served by the Tōkyū Den-en-toshi Line and Tōkyū Ōimachi Line. It is 10.1 kilometers from the starting point of the Tōkyū Den-en-toshi Line at Shibuya Station.

Station layout
The station consists of two elevated opposed side platforms serving two tracks. The station building is located underneath the tracks and platforms.

Platforms

History 
It was renamed to Futago-Jizen in 1935. On July 1, 1943, it became part of the Ōimachi Line and was rebuilt to a train station. The station was rebuilt on March 18, 1966, as an elevated station along with the construction of Futako Bridge (二子橋梁). The station was renamed to its present name on December 16, 1977. From 2005 - 2008 the platforms were rebuilt for expansion of Tōkyū Ōimachi Line.

Passenger statistics
In fiscal 2019, the station was used by an average of 21,734 passengers daily.

The passenger figures for previous years are as shown below.

Surrounding area
Tama River
Futago Bridge
Futako Shrine
Kanoko Okamoto Literature Monument "Pride"—produced by Taro Okamoto.

See also
 List of railway stations in Japan

References

External links

 

Railway stations in Kanagawa Prefecture
Railway stations in Japan opened in 1927
Railway stations in Kawasaki, Kanagawa